The Lyme Academy of Fine Arts is an art school in Old Lyme, Connecticut. From 1992 to 2019 it was a degree-granting institution, and from 2016 it was constituent college of the University of New Haven, as Lyme Academy College of Fine Arts.

History

The Lyme Academy was founded in 1976 by Elisabeth Gordon Chandler as a figurative academy for the teaching of sculpture, figure drawing, Illustration and painting dedicated to the fine arts. The school offered a Bachelor of Fine Arts degree in the disciplines of painting, sculpture, illustration and drawing, as well as post-baccalaureate and a three-year certificate programs.

1992-2019
BFA degrees were first awarded in 1992, and between 2014 and 2019 the academy was affiliated with the University of New Haven. Under that agreement, Lyme kept ownership of the campus and its own Board of Trustees; New Haven acquired the academic degree programs. The business plan underlying that cooperation was that 200 students would enroll at the academy, a goal that was never reached; according the Michael Thomas Duffy, chair of the academy's board in 2021, the academy enrolled about 120 students at most. In 2019, "the University of New Haven discontinued degree-granting academic offerings". New Haven president Steven H. Kaplan said that at the time the affiliation with Lyme Academy would add a fine arts degree to the university, but the academy struggled to get enrollment figures up (with 139 students for the fall of 2017, and 122 in August 2018)

Since 2019
After a few difficult years, the academy hired new staff and a new artistic director Jordan Sokol, and saw about 120 students enroll for the summer term of 2021. At the time it had a budget of $1.657 million. The board planned to return to the earlier goals of the academy and adopted a manifesto for its reboot, including "adhering to the philosophy of Chandler, who believed artists needed to learn the fundamentals of figurative art ... in small classes with a high teacher to student ratio." They hoped to enroll 10 full-time students in the fall of 2021, and possibly 15 in the spring of 2022. Tuition for full-time core students was set at $9,600 per year. In addition, the academy planned to offer perhaps two dozen workshops annually, as well as four weekly part-time classes.

References

External links

"10 Point Manifesto for the revival of the Lyme Academy of Fine Arts as it plans for its 50th Anniversary in 2026"

Old Lyme, Connecticut
Universities and colleges in Connecticut
Art schools in Connecticut
Educational institutions established in 1976
Universities and colleges in New London County, Connecticut
1976 establishments in Connecticut